Jin Han (born 7 June 1993) is a Chinese actor and singer.

Career
In 2012, Jin made his first appearance in Tiger Hu's music video.
He made his acting debut in the television series City Lover, which was filmed in 2012. 

In 2014, Jin starred in the youth film The Fervent Youth, which he won an award for at the Xiangyang University Student Film Festival.

In 2015, Jin participated in the reality show Road to Star, and later came in third at the grand finals.

In 2016, Jin gained attention for his portrayal of a villain in the historical drama The Princess Weiyoung.  He then gained increased recognition with the historical action drama Princess Agents, once again portraying an antagonistic character.

In 2018, Jin starred alongside Zhao Liying in the modern romance drama Our Glamorous Time. He gained positive reviews for his portrayal of a special agent turned CEO, and experienced a rise in popularity. 

In 2019, Jin starred alongside Qi Wei in the legal romance drama No Secrets, adapted from the South Korean drama I Can Hear Your Voice. The same year, he starred in the historical political drama Royal Nirvana.

Filmography

Film

Television series

Variety and reality show

Discography

Awards and nominations

References

1993 births
Living people
21st-century Chinese male actors
People from Xining
Musicians from Qinghai
Chinese male television actors 
Chinese male film actors